Petr Novický (born 26 March 1948) was a basketball player who represented the Czechoslovakia national basketball team between 1969 and 1975. He took part in the 1972 Summer Olympics as well as the 1970 FIBA World Championship and three editions of the FIBA EuroBasket competition.

References

External links 
Profile at FIBA.com

1948 births
Living people
Czechoslovak men's basketball players
1970 FIBA World Championship players
Czech men's basketball players
Olympic basketball players of Czechoslovakia
Basketball players at the 1972 Summer Olympics
Sportspeople from Olomouc